The 1984 Women's EuroHockey Nations Championship was the inaugural edition of the Women's EuroHockey Nations Championship, the quadrennial international women's field hockey championship of Europe organized by the European Hockey Federation. It was held in Lille, France, from 3 to 13 May 1984.

The Netherlands won the first-ever European Championship by defeating the Soviet Union 2–0 in the final. West Germany won the bronze medal by defeating England 1–0.

Preliminary round

Pool A

Pool B

Classification round

Ninth to twelfth place classification

9–12th place semi-finals

Eleventh place game

Ninth place game

Fifth to eighth place classification

5–8th place semi-finals

Seventh place game

Fifth place game

First to fourth place classification

Semi-finals

Third place game

Final

Final standings

External links
Eurohockey Nations Championship Women Lille (Fra) May 1984 from eurohockey.org

Women's EuroHockey Nations Championship
EuroHockey Nations Championship
EuroHockey Nations Championship Women
International women's field hockey competitions hosted by France
EuroHockey Nations Championship Women
Sport in Lille